Oxyopomyrmex is a genus of ants in the subfamily Myrmicinae.

Species
Oxyopomyrmex emeryi Santschi, 1908
Oxyopomyrmex gaetulus Santschi, 1929
Oxyopomyrmex insularis Santschi, 1908
Oxyopomyrmex krueperi Forel, 1911
Oxyopomyrmex laevibus Salata & Borowiec, 2015
Oxyopomyrmex lagoi Menozzi, 1936
Oxyopomyrmex magnus Salata & Borowiec, 2015
Oxyopomyrmex negevensis Salata & Borowiec, 2015
Oxyopomyrmex nigripes Santschi, 1907
Oxyopomyrmex nitidior Santschi, 1910
Oxyopomyrmex oculatus André, 1881
Oxyopomyrmex polybotesi Salata & Borowiec, 2015
Oxyopomyrmex pygmalioni Salata & Borowiec, 2015
Oxyopomyrmex sabulonis Santschi, 1915
Oxyopomyrmex santschii Forel, 1904
Oxyopomyrmex saulcyi Emery, 1889

References

External links

Myrmicinae
Ant genera